Jenna Maclaine is an American author specializing in paranormal romance. Mclaine has a BA in history from North Georgia College & State University. She lives on a farm with over 80 animals in the foothills of the Blue Ridge Mountains.

Works

Cin Craven Series

The Righteous in The Mammoth Book of Vampire Romance (July 2008)
The Wages of Sin (July 29, 2008)
Grave Sins (February 3, 2009)
Sin Slayer in Huntress (June 30, 2009)
Dark Sins in Strange Brew (July 7, 2009)
Bound by Sin (December 29, 2009)
The Eternal Warrior in The Mammoth Book of Irish Romance (January 26, 2010)

Reviews
Romantic Times gave four-star reviews to both Wages of Sin and Grave Sins.

References

External links

21st-century American novelists
American romantic fiction writers
American women novelists
Urban fantasy writers
Living people
21st-century American women writers
1975 births